The 1992–93 Courage League National Division Two  was the sixth full season of rugby union within the second tier of the English league system, currently known as the RFU Championship. There were thirteen teams in the division, with each team meeting the other teams once to give a total of twelve matches each. Joining the nine teams who remained in the division from last season were Nottingham and Rosslyn Park who were both relegated from the top division. It was Nottingham's first season in the division and Rosslyn Park's second.  Park's only other appearance was in the very first season when they were the champions.  Both the promoted teams, Fylde and Richmond, were relegated back to the third tier.  In Richmond's case, somewhat unlucky as in normal circumstances finishing ninth would have been high enough in the table to survive the drop.

At the sixth attempt, Newcastle Gosforth the champions, were promoted to the Courage League National Division One for season 1993–94. Due to next seasons reduction of teams from thirteen to ten in the top two divisions, second placed Waterloo did not gain promotion and seven teams were relegated to Courage League National Division Three. They were Bedford, Rosslyn Park, Richmond, Blackheath, Coventry, Fylde and Morley. Rosslyn Park were relegated for the second successive season.

Participating teams

Table

Sponsorship
National Division Two is part of the Courage Clubs Championship and was sponsored by Courage Brewery

See also
 English rugby union system

References 

N2
RFU Championship seasons